Pták Rosomák is the second album of Czech band Olympic published in 1969 at Supraphon. Its catalogue numbers are: 0 13 0589 (mono) and 1 13 0589 (stereo). The original album had an inset as well. It was republished in 1990 as an album and in 2005 in CD as a renewed version.

Songs

Side A 
 Krásná neznámá (Petr Janda/Pavel Chrastina) - 2:30
 Ikarus blues (Ladislav Klein/Zdeněk Rytíř) - 5:00
 Báječné místo (Petr Janda/Pavel Chrastina) - 4:30
 Everybody (Petr Janda/Pavel Chrastina) - 3:50
 O půlnoci (Petr Janda/Pavel Chrastina) - 2:50
 Pták Rosomák (Petr Janda/Pavel Chrastina) - 2:51

Side B 
 Tvé neklidné svědomí (Petr Janda/František Ringo Čech/Pavel Chrastina) - 3:30
 Čekám na zázrak (Petr Janda/Pavel Chrastina) - 2:55
 Z bílé černou (Petr Janda/Pavel Chrastina) - 2:45
 Pohřeb své vlastní duše (Petr Janda/Pavel Chrastina) - 4:05
 Kamenožrout zelený (Petr Janda/Pavel Chrastina) - 3:45
 Svatojánský happening (Petr Janda/Pavel Chrastina) - 2:25

References

Olympic (band) albums
1969 albums